Abhyankar is a surname native to the Indian state of Maharashtra. Abhyankar surname is found among Chitpavan Brahmin community.

Etymology
Abhyankar is a Sanskrit word which means One who removes fears.

Notable people
Notable people with the surname include:
Anand Abhyankar (1963–2012), Indian film, television and theatre actor
Anupama Gokhale (born Anupama Abhyankar in 1969), Indian chess player
Moreshwar Vasudeo Abhyankar (1886–1935), Indian lawyer and freedom fighter
Sanjeev Abhyankar (born 1969), Indian classical vocalist
Shreeram Shankar Abhyankar (1930–2012), Indian-American mathematician  
Abhyankar's conjecture
Abhyankar's inequality
Abhyankar's lemma
Abhyankar–Moh theorem

See also
Joshi-Abhyankar serial murders

References

Marathi-language surnames